Albert Krumm (January 1865 – June 15, 1937) was a Major League Baseball pitcher who played in 1889 with the Pittsburgh Alleghenys and had his single major league start on May 17th of that year.

Primarily a steelworker, he had a reputation as a "troublemaker." He was in spring training with the Washington Senators in 1895 and pitched in an exhibition game with Varney Anderson but did not make the team. Krumm walked ten batters during his first game with the Alleghenys. He stayed with the team until July but never pitched again.

He was born in Pennsylvania and died in San Diego, California.

References

External links
, Baseball Reference (Minors)

1865 births
1937 deaths
19th-century baseball players
Baseball players from Pennsylvania
Dayton Reds players
Lima Lushers players
Major League Baseball pitchers
Pittsburgh Alleghenys players
Date of birth unknown